Dyspanopeus is a genus of crabs in the family Xanthoidea, comprising two species:
Dyspanopeus sayi (Smith, 1869)
Dyspanopeus texanus (Stimpson, 1859)

Both species were formerly included in the genus Panopeus, but were separated off into a segregate genus in 1986, based on the form of their pleopods, which differ markedly from those in Panopeus and other genera.

References

External links

Xanthoidea